Pleurota is a genus of moths belonging to the family Oecophoridae. The species of this genus are found in Europe, southern Africa and North America.

Species
The following are recognised in the genus Pleurota:
 
Pleurota acratopa 
Pleurota acutella 
Pleurota agadirensis 
Pleurota agastopis 
Pleurota albarracina 
Pleurota albastrigulella 
Pleurota algeriella 
Pleurota amaniella 
Pleurota amaurodoxa 
Pleurota aorsella 
Pleurota aprilella 
Pleurota aragonella 
Pleurota arduella 
Pleurota argodonta 
Pleurota argoptera 
Pleurota aristella 
Pleurota armeniella 
Pleurota asiatica 
Pleurota atlasensis 
Pleurota azrouensis 
Pleurota berytella 
Pleurota bicostella 
Pleurota bitrabicella
Pleurota brevispinella 
Pleurota brevivitella 
Pleurota callizona 
Pleurota castagniccia 
Pleurota chalepensis 
Pleurota chlorochyta 
Pleurota cnephaea 
Pleurota contignatella 
Pleurota contristatella 
Pleurota crassinervis 
Pleurota creticella 
Pleurota cumaniella 
Pleurota cyrniella 
Pleurota dalilae 
Pleurota dissimilella 
Pleurota drucella 
Pleurota elegans 
Pleurota endesma 
Pleurota epiclines 
Pleurota epitripta 
Pleurota ericella 
Pleurota eximia 
Pleurota filigerella  
Pleurota flavella 
Pleurota flavescens 
Pleurota forficella 
Pleurota gallicella 
Pleurota generosella 
Pleurota glitzella 
Pleurota goundafella 
Pleurota grisea 
Pleurota griseella 
Pleurota gypsina 
Pleurota hastiformis 
Pleurota hebetella 
Pleurota himantias 
Pleurota holoxesta 
Pleurota homaima 
Pleurota homalota 
Pleurota honorella  
Pleurota hoplophanes 
Pleurota huebneri 
Pleurota idalia 
Pleurota illucidella 
Pleurota indecorella 
Pleurota insignella 
Pleurota issicella 
Pleurota karmeliella 
Pleurota karsholti 
Pleurota kerbelella 
Pleurota kostjuki  
Pleurota kullbergi 
Pleurota lacteella 
Pleurota lacteola 
Pleurota largella 
Pleurota lepigrei 
Pleurota leucogramma 
Pleurota leucostephes 
Pleurota lineata 
Pleurota lomographa 
Pleurota macroscia 
Pleurota macrosella 
Pleurota macrosticha 
Pleurota majorella 
Pleurota marginella  
Pleurota mauretanica 
Pleurota metricella  
Pleurota minimella 
Pleurota monochroma 
Pleurota monotonia 
Pleurota montalbella 
Pleurota moroccoensis 
Pleurota murina 
Pleurota neotes 
Pleurota neurograpta 
Pleurota nitens 
Pleurota nobilella 
Pleurota obtusella 
Pleurota ochreopalpella 
Pleurota ochreostrigella 
Pleurota oranella 
Pleurota paragallicella 
Pleurota pellicolor 
Pleurota peloxantha 
Pleurota pentapolitella 
Pleurota phaeolepida 
Pleurota phormictis 
Pleurota photodotis 
Pleurota picea 
Pleurota placina 
Pleurota planella 
Pleurota platyrrhoa 
Pleurota pleurotella 
Pleurota protasella 
Pleurota proteella 
Pleurota protogramma 
Pleurota proxima 
Pleurota psammoxantha 
Pleurota psephena 
Pleurota punctella 
Pleurota pungitiella 
Pleurota pyropella 
Pleurota rostrella 
Pleurota scolopistis 
Pleurota sefrainella 
Pleurota semicanella 
Pleurota semophanes 
Pleurota simplex 
Pleurota sobriella 
Pleurota sparella 
Pleurota staintoniella 
Pleurota stasiastica 
Pleurota stenodesma 
Pleurota submetricella 
Pleurota subpyropella 
Pleurota syriaca 
Pleurota syrtium 
Pleurota taepperi 
Pleurota taepperi 
Pleurota teligerella 
Pleurota tenellula 
Pleurota tephrina 
Pleurota ternaria 
Pleurota tetrargyra 
Pleurota themeropis 
Pleurota thiopepla 
Pleurota titanitis 
Pleurota trichomella 
Pleurota tricolor 
Pleurota tristatella 
Pleurota tristictella 
Pleurota tritosticta 
Pleurota tyrochroa 
Pleurota uygar 
Pleurota variocolor 
Pleurota vittalba 
Pleurota wiltshirei 
Pleurota xiphochrysa 
Pleurota zalocoma 
BOLD:ACJ0629 Pleurota sp.
BOLD:ACP2554 Pleurota sp.
BOLD:ACW1991 Pleurota sp.
BOLD:ACW2251 Pleurota sp.
BOLD:ADA2309 Pleurota sp.
BOLD:ADB1135 Pleurota sp.
BOLD:ADR2762 Pleurota sp.
BOLD:AEC9409 Pleurota sp.

References

Oecophoridae